Natacha Diona Bibi (born 20 June 1984) is a Seychellois footballer and athlete who plays as a forward for the Seychelles national team.

Football career

Club 
Bibi played for Olympia Coast in 2005; she helped them win the Seychelles Women's League in 2006 as top scorer with 14 goals. Bibi helped Olympia Coast to a domestic double in 2007, winning the league and the cup, in which she scored a hat-trick in the final.

In 2009, Bibi finishing runner-up in the Land Marine Cup with La Digue Veuve. In 2010, she helped her side win the domestic double, winning the league and scoring all four goals in the cup final. Bibi was nominated Player of the Year in 2011.

International 
She scored a goal in a 4–1 friendly defeat to the United Arab Emirates on 15 September 2021.

On 20 February 2022, Bibi scored a second-half brace to help her side beat the Maldives 4–0 in a friendly tournament. In April 2022, Bibi took part in the 2022 FAS Tri-Nations Series with Seychelles; she scored a brace against hosts Singapore in the opening game on 4 April, in a 6–2 defeat. On 5 July 2022, she scored a hat-trick against Rodrigues in the 2022 Mauritius Triangular.

Athletics career 
Bibi won the women's 800 metres, 1500 metres and high jump at the 1999 Seychellois Championship. On 14 August 2000, Bibi beat Margaret Morel's 800 metres national record, clocking 2:16.85 at the 2000 African Southern Region Athletics Championships.

Bibi represented Seychelles at the 2001 African Junior Athletics Championships, winning bronze in the women's long jump; she also ran in the first round of the 800 meters. She won bronze in the long jump once again, at the 2019 Indian Ocean Island Games.

Career statistics

International

Scores and results list Seychelles's goal tally first, score column indicates score after each Bibi goal.

References

External links
 Natacha Bibi at InterSportStats

1984 births
Living people
Place of birth missing (living people)
Seychellois female middle-distance runners
Seychellois female long jumpers
Seychellois women's footballers
Women's association football forwards
Seychelles Women's League players
Seychelles women's international footballers